Richard Jack Stello (July 20, 1934 – November 18, 1987) was an American professional baseball umpire. He worked in the National League from 1968 to his death in 1987. He wore uniform number 18 for most of his career.

Early life
Stello was born in Boston and lived in an orphanage until age 12. At that point, he went to live with a foster family on a rural Massachusetts farm. He joined the United States Air Force and was an airman first class. He was introduced to umpiring while in the air force stationed in Tokyo. He umpired local baseball for a year before attending an umpire school and graduating at the top of his class.

Umpiring career
He umpired 2,764 major league games in his 20-year career. He umpired in two World Series (1975 and 1981), two All-Star Games (1977 and 1987) and five National League Championship Series (1971, 1976, 1979, 1983, and 1985). Stello was an instructor at the Al Somers Umpire School.

Personal life
He was married to stripper and actress Liliana Wilczkowska, better known as Chesty Morgan, from 1974 to a 1979 divorce. After the split, they stayed in touch until his death.

Death
On November 18, 1987, Stello was stopped on the side of a two-lane highway and standing between his car and another car. A third car struck the parked cars from behind and Stello was crushed between them. He died instantly.

See also 

 List of Major League Baseball umpires

References

External links
The Sporting News umpire card

1934 births
1987 deaths
Major League Baseball umpires
Merrimack College alumni
Pedestrian road incident deaths
Road incident deaths in Florida
Sportspeople from Boston
United States Air Force airmen